Thomas Jonathan Jackson is a historic bronze equestrian statue of Confederate general Stonewall Jackson which was formerly located at Courthouse Historic District of Charlottesville, Virginia and installed in 1921. The statue was sculpted by Charles Keck and was the third of four works commissioned from members of the National Sculpture Society by philanthropist Paul Goodloe McIntire. It was the second of three statues McIntire donated to the city of Charlottesville, which he did over a period of five years from 1919 to 1924. The statue was listed on the National Register of Historic Places in 1997.

Controversy and removal

In April 2016, the Charlottesville City Council appointed a special commission, named the Blue Ribbon Commission on Race, Monuments and Public Spaces, to recommend to city officials how to best handle issues surrounding Confederate statues and monuments in Charlottesville. In February 2017, as part of the removal of Confederate monuments and memorials, the Charlottesville City Council voted 3–2 for the statue's removal, along with the Robert E. Lee Monument; both were vandalized in September 2019, with "1619" graffitied on the Jackson statue, in reference to the date of the arrival of the first Africans in Virginia. It was vandalized again in October 2019. On July 10, 2021, the city council removed the statues of Jackson and Lee.

See also
George Rogers Clark Monument
Meriwether Lewis and William Clark (sculpture)
Robert E. Lee Monument (Charlottesville, Virginia)

References

External links

Monuments and memorials on the National Register of Historic Places in Virginia
Bronze sculptures in Virginia
1921 sculptures
Outdoor sculptures in Charlottesville, Virginia
National Register of Historic Places in Charlottesville, Virginia
Individually listed contributing properties to historic districts on the National Register in Virginia
Jackson, Stonewall
1921 establishments in Virginia
Sculptures of men in Virginia
Confederate States of America monuments and memorials in Virginia
Stonewall Jackson
Charlottesville historic monument controversy
Removed Confederate States of America monuments and memorials
Vandalized works of art in Virginia
Monuments and memorials in Virginia removed during the George Floyd protests
Sculptures by Charles Keck